The Orkhon inscriptions (also known as the Orhon inscriptions, Orhun inscriptions, Khöshöö Tsaidam monuments (also spelled Khoshoo Tsaidam, Koshu-Tsaidam or Höshöö Caidam), or Kul Tigin steles are two memorial installations erected by the Göktürks written in the Old Turkic alphabet in the early 8th century in the Orkhon Valley in what is modern-day Mongolia. They were erected in honor of two Turkic princes, Kul Tigin and his brother Bilge Khagan.

The inscriptions, in both Chinese and Old Turkic, relate the legendary origins of the Turks, the golden age of their history, their subjugation by the Tang dynasty, and their liberation by Ilterish Qaghan.  According to one source, the inscriptions contain "rhythmic and parallelistic passages" which resemble that of epics.

Discovery and translation
The inscriptions were discovered by Nikolay Yadrintsev's expedition in 1889, published by Vasily Radlov. The original text was written in the Old Turkic alphabet and was deciphered by the Danish philologist Vilhelm Thomsen in 1893. Vilhelm Thomsen first published the translation in French in 1899. He then published another interpretation in Danish in 1922 with a more complete translation.

Region
Orkhon Valley is a region on the western Orkhon River in modern-day Mongolia, near Ögii Lake. More specifically, they stand about fifty miles north of the Erdene Zuu Monastery, and approximately twenty-five miles northwest of the Ordu-Baliq.

Importance
Before the Orkhon Inscriptions were deciphered by Vilhelm Thomsen, very little was known about Turkic script. The scripts are the oldest form of a Turkic language to be preserved. When the Orkhon inscriptions were first discovered, it was obvious that they were a runic type of script that had been discovered at other sites, but these versions also had a clear form, similar to an alphabet. When Vilhelm Thomsen deciphered the translation it was a huge stepping stone in understanding old Turkic script. The inscriptions provided much of the foundation for translating other Turkic writings.

The scripts follow an alphabetical form, but also appear to have strong influences of rune carvings. The inscriptions are a great example of early signs of nomadic society's transitions from use of runes to a uniform alphabet, and the Orkhon alphabet is thought to have been derived from or inspired by a non-cursive version of the Sogdian script.

Restoration
Both inscriptions are part of the Orkhon Valley Cultural Landscape UNESCO World Heritage Site in Mongolia. TIKA (Turkish International Cooperation and Development Agency) showed interest in the site in the late 20th century and finalized their project to restore and protect all three inscriptions. Since 2000, over 70 archeologists from around the world (specifically from Uighur, Turkmenistan, Azerbaijan, Uzbekistan, Tataristan and Turkey) have studied the area and performed excavations. The site is now protected by fences with buildings for research work and storage of artifacts. The total cost of the project is around 20 million dollars and eventually will include the building of a museum to house the inscriptions and other recently discovered artifacts.

Historical context
They were erected by the Göktürks in the early 8th century. They commemorate the brothers Bilge Khagan (683-734) and Kul-Tegin (684-731), one a politician and the other a military commander. Both were descendants of Ilterish Qaghan of the Second Turkic Khaganate, which was a prominent Turkic nomadic society during the Tang dynasty.

The Göktürks have left artifacts and installations all over their domain, from Manchuria to the Black Sea. But only in modern-day Mongolia have any memorials to kings and other aristocrats been found. The ones in Khöshöö Tsaidam consist of tablets with inscriptions in Chinese and Old Turkic characters. Both monuments are stone slabs originally erected on carved stone turtles within walled enclosures. Bilge Khagan's stone shows a carved ibex (the emblem of Göktürk Kagans) and a twisted dragon. In both enclosings, evidence of altars and carved depictions of human couples were found, possibly depicting the respective honorary and his spouse.

The Old Turkic inscriptions on these monuments were written by Yollug Tigin who was nephew of Bilge Khagan. These inscriptions together with the Tonyukuk inscription, are the oldest extant attestation of that language. The inscriptions clearly show the sacred importance of the region, as evidenced by the statement, "If you stay in the land of the Ötüken, and send caravans from there, you will have no trouble. If you stay at the Ötüken Mountains, you will live forever dominating the tribes!"

Content of the inscriptions 

A full English translation of the inscriptions may be found in The Orkhon Inscriptions: Being a Translation of Professor Vilhelm Thomsen's Final Danish Rendering

The two monuments themselves have engravings on all four sides. However, some of the script was not preserved, or is missing, and therefore only portions of the original message remain. What follows is a summary of the most complete section of the inscriptions.

One translation of the first and second monuments seems to indicate that the text continues from one side to the other.

The first portion of the Turkic translations seems to be Bilge Khagan discussing the commemoration of the tablet, as well as mentioning the extent of the empire. One passage reads,  Continuing on, the inscriptions discuss the conquests of the Bilge Khagan and the struggles that he and his people face with the Chinese. The inscriptions even describe the Turks being enslaved by the Chinese.

However, the inscriptions also highlight Bilge Khagan's accomplishment of uniting his people. As one passage reads, 

The rest of the inscriptions are broken up and sporadic, but seem to detail the conquests against the Kirghiz and the Tangut peoples and also the death of Kul-Tegin in battle, and eventually the succession of Bilge Khagan by his son. Bilge Khagan's mother El Bilga Khatun was also mentioned in these inscriptions.

The following is an excerpt from the last paragraph of the inscriptions (in Old Turkic and English languages):

Relations with the Chinese

The inscriptions seem to have mixed views on Tang Chinese influence. On the one hand, it seems to contain the view that the Turks despise the Chinese. It appears as though Bilge Khagan wanted to distinguish his people from the Chinese in order to remain a strong independent society. In the inscription Bilge Khagan reprimands those Turks who have been influenced by Chinese culture and have adopted a Chinese way of life. As one passage reads, 

The claimed enslavement of the Turks also did not help the reputation of the Chinese. Bilge Khagan seems to blame the Chinese for the disunion of his Turkic state. This Turkic view of the Chinese seems to be negative.

Orkhon inscriptions indicate prisoners of war have often designated the status of slavery. Inscriptions found in the First Turkic Khaganate also imply that terms denoting slavery or other forms of subordinate status, such as qul (male slave) and küng (female slave or handmaiden), are frequently applied to a population of defeated political entities.

However, the translation also reveals a degree of diplomacy with the neighboring Chinese, as evidenced by his statement, 

Bilge Khagan also references the hiring of Chinese artists when he claims,  To further complicate the already muddled view of the Chinese, the inscriptions contain both Turkic and Chinese translations. Thus, the inscription contains evidence that Bilge Khagan had cultural interaction with the Tang dynasty.

See also 
 Old Turkic alphabet
 Bilge Khagan
 Kul Tigin
 History of the Turkic peoples

References

Citations

Sources 

 Report of the 28th Session of the World Heritage Committee
 Sören Stark Die Alttürkenzeit in Mittel- und Zentralasien. Archäologische und historische Studien (Nomaden und Seshafte, Band 6). Reichert: Wiesbanden 2008, pp. 76–78, plates 5-7.

External links
 Omniglot: Old Turkic Language
 Orkhon Inscriptions Text

1889 archaeological discoveries
8th-century inscriptions
History of Mongolia
Archaeological sites in Mongolia
Chinese inscriptions
Göktürk inscriptions
Speeches by heads of state